The Ankarana sportive lemur (Lepilemur ankaranensis), or Ankarana weasel lemur, is a sportive lemur endemic to Madagascar. The Ankarana sportive lemur is found in northern Madagascar, living in dry lowland forests in Ankarana, Andrafiamena and Analamerana, and in moist montane forest of Montagne d'Ambre.

References

Sportive lemurs
Mammals described in 1975